The SMX Convention Center Manila is a convention center located in Pasay, Philippines. It is the largest private venue in the Philippines for trade events, industry conventions, corporate functions, and international exhibitions. The building is located beside the SM Mall of Asia, and is considered part of the Mall of Asia Complex. It is owned by the company of the same name.

History
Work on the construction of the SMX Convention Center, then known as the MAITRADE Expo and Convention Center began with the groundbreaking ceremony held on March 23, 2006. The cement pouring ceremony was held a few months later on September 21 of the same year.

The SMX Convention Center was opened in November 2007.

Facilities
It is suitable for many events.

Events

Since its opening in November 2007, the SMX Convention Center has held some of the largest trade events in the country, including CITEM's Manila FAME International, International Food and Beverage Expo, Global Link MP's China Products Exhibition, Manufacturing Technology World Series, and Primetrade Asia's Manila International Book Fair. The ASEAN Tourism Investment Forum 2008 and the 8th International Conference of Asian Clinical Oncology Society were also held in the SMX Convention Center.

On November 28 and 29, 2011, the 5th National G12 Conference was held in the SMX. The event used all four exhibit halls and the function rooms on the third floor. With almost 20,000 guests, the event exceeded the typical capacity of the Convention Center of 12,000. The four halls were converted into one huge space.

On November 12, 2017, the Gala Dinner of the 31st ASEAN Summit was held in SMX.

On March 24 and 25, 2018, ComicCon Asia was held in SMX.

It is the main venue of Cosplay Mania's series of events since 2010, after their initial tenure at the Megatrade Hall.

In addition to exhibitions and conventions, the Convention Center it can accommodate other events and concerts. In August 2008 international artist Alicia Keys' As I Am Tour and the grand finale of GMA Network's Pinoy Idol were held at the convention center.

References

External links
SMX Convention Center Manila

Convention and exhibition centers in Metro Manila
Buildings and structures in Pasay
SM Mall of Asia